The Winterset Award is a Canadian literary award, presented annually by the Newfoundland and Labrador Arts Council to a work judged to be the best book, regardless of genre, published by a writer from Newfoundland and Labrador.

The award was created by journalist and historian Richard Gwyn in memory of his wife Sandra following her death in 2000. Winterset was the name of Sandra Gwyn's childhood home in St. John's.

Winners
 2000 - Michael Winter, This All Happened
 2001 - Michael Crummey, The River Thieves
 2002 - Joan Clark, The Word for Home
 2003 - Robert Mellin, Tilting
 2004 - Edward Riche, The Nine Planets
 2005 - Joan Clark, An Audience of Chairs
 2006 - Kenneth J. Harvey, Inside
 2007 - Kathleen Winter, boYs
 2008 - Randall Maggs, Night Work: The Sawchuk Poems
 2009 - Jessica Grant, Come, Thou Tortoise
 2010 - Russell Wangersky, The Glass Harmonica
 2011 - Don McKay, The Shell of the Tortoise
 2012 - Andy Jones, Jack & Mary in the Land of Thieves
 2013 - Paul Bowdring, The Strangers' Gallery
 2014 - Megan Gail Coles, Eating Habits of the Chronically Lonesome
 2015 - Sara Tilley, Duke
 2016 - Paul Rowe, The Last Half of the Year
 2017 - Joel Thomas Hynes, We'll All Be Burnt in Our Beds Some Night
 2018 - Heather Smith, Ebb & Flow
 2019 - Megan Gail Coles, Small Game Hunting at the Local Coward Gun Club
2020 - Eva Crocker, All I Ask

References

External links
Winterset Award

Canadian non-fiction literary awards
Newfoundland and Labrador awards
Awards established in 2000
2000 establishments in Newfoundland and Labrador
Canadian fiction awards
Canadian poetry awards